Heterotheca zionensis, the Zion goldenaster, is a North American species of flowering plant in the family Asteraceae. It grows in Utah, Arizona, New Mexico and western Texas. The plant has also reportedly been found in southeastern Idaho and northwestern Colorado, but these are most likely introductions.

References

zionensis
Flora of the Southwestern United States
Plants described in 1987